Thomas Belasyse, 1st Viscount Fauconberg (1577 – 18 April 1653), styled Baron Fauconberg between 1627 and 1643 and Sir Thomas Belasyse, 2nd Baronet between 1624 and 1627, was an English politician who sat in the House of Commons at various times between 1597 and 1624 and was raised to the peerage in 1627. He was an ardent supporter of the Royalist cause in the English Civil War.

Before the Civil War, Belasyse and his family had a long running confrontation with Sir Thomas Wentworth, a close advisor to King Charles I, primarily over local government issues in Yorkshire. This confrontation did not shake Belasyse's support for the monarchy and before and during the Civil War, he and his son Henry, were ardent supporters of the Royalist cause. Charles honoured Belasye in appreciation, but towards the end of the First Civil War, Belasye was forced to flee abroad. While he was in exile his estates were sequestered by Parliament because he was a known "delinquent", and on his return to England and as he refused to swear to the oath of abjuration he was convicted of recusancy.

Biography
Belasyse was educated at Jesus College, Cambridge in the early 1590s. He had Roman Catholic leanings, and married into a known recusant family, but stayed within the laws of the time and attended Anglican Church services. He entered Parliament in 1597 when he was elected to represent Thirsk, a seat his father had held, in the second from last Elizabethan parliament. He was knighted by James I and served as a justice of the peace in the North Riding. He remained active in national politics and represented Thirsk again in the 1614, 1621, and 1624 parliaments of James I.

During the early years of the reign of Charles I the Belasyse family sided with Sir John Savile, the custos rotulorum of the West Riding, against Sir Thomas Wentworth. The Savile's allied themselves with the Duke of Buckingham and it may have been through this political connection that on 25 May 1627 that Belasyse was raised to the peerage as Lord Fauconberg of Yarm.

After the assassination of Buckingham, Wentworth's influence at court grew and with it his power, while that of his political opponents Yorkshire waned. After Wentworths's appointment as president of the council of the north in 1628, Fauconberg and his son Henry were briefly imprisoned and they opposed the style of government that Wentworth's influence at court helped to foster.

With the impeachment and execution of Wentworth, now 1st Earl of Strafford, in 1641 Fauconberg political fortunes waxed. Like many of the gentry and nobility with Roman Catholic leanings he supported Charles I in his struggle with Parliament. During the summer of 1642, in the months before the war started while Charles resided in York, Fauconberg and his sons Henry and John were prominent supporters. His elder son Henry a Knight of the Shire signed a treaty of neutrality with Thomas Fairfax, (but its terms were rejected by Parliament) and John his other son commanded a regiment of Foot. Fauconberg's loyalty to Charles was rewarded on 31 January 1643 he was granted the title of Viscount Fauconberg of Henknowle, county Durham (his second son, John, was made Baron Belasys of Worlaby in 1645).

Fauconberg supported William Cavendish, Marquis of Newcastle, followed the fortunes of that nobleman in the siege of York, which held out three months against powerful Scottish and Parliamentary armies. When the Royalists garrison of York and a relieving army under the command of Prince Rupert lost the Battle of Marston Moor on 2 July 1644, Newcastle and Fauconberg escaped into exile, embarking at Scarborough, for Hamburg. While he was abroad his estates were sequestered for his delinquency, which he compounded by paying a fine of £5012 18s. He returned to the North Riding in 1649 but refused to swear the Oath of Abjuration and was convicted of recusancy. He died on 18 April 1653, and was buried in the parish church of Coxwold, in the county of York.

Family
Fauconberg married Barbara Cholmley (c. 1575 – 28 February 1619), the daughter of Sir Henry Cholmley of Roxby in Whitby Strand, a family noted for its recusancy. Their daughter Barbara Belasyse (1609/1610 – 1641) married in 1631 Sir Henry Slingsby of Scriven, 1st Baronet. His eldest son Henry predeceased him in 1647, his eldest son, Thomas, Fauconberg's grandson, inherited the title. Unlike his grandfather and father Thomas supported the Parliamentary cause, and later married Mary, a daughter of Oliver Cromwell. Fauconberg's second son John was raised to the peerage by Charles II as Baron Belasyse.

Notes

References

Further reading

1577 births
1653 deaths
Cavaliers
English Roman Catholics
Alumni of Jesus College, Cambridge
16th-century Roman Catholics
17th-century Roman Catholics
English MPs 1597–1598
English MPs 1614
English MPs 1621–1622
English MPs 1624–1625
Viscounts Fauconberg